Pratiglione is a comune (municipality) in the Metropolitan City of Turin in the Italian region Piedmont.

Pratiglione borders the following municipalities: Sparone, Canischio, Canischio, Valperga, Prascorsano, Corio, Forno Canavese, and Rivara.

References

Cities and towns in Piedmont